Realtime Trains is a website that tracks trains on the British railway network.

History
Realtime Trains was launched in October 2012 by Tom Cairns, a student at the University of Southampton.

In March 2020, Abellio ScotRail became the first operator to share additional rolling stock information with Realtime Trains. The additional information was dubbed Know Your Train, and includes a visual overview of the type of rolling stock and number of carriages used by each service. Operators which now offer this information include Northern Trains and TransPennine Express. In May 2021, Realtime Trains stated that 45% of the distance travelled by trains on the British railway network was covered by Know Your Train.

Another service called Track Your Train was added in September 2020, offering advanced notice of platform alterations and potential delays to a service. Initially, Track Your Train is only available on selected services starting at London Liverpool Street.

Following a grant from the Culture Recovery Fund, in 2021 Realtime Trains installed live departure boards for Swanage Railway heritage services at Corfe Castle and Swanage stations.

Data sources
The data presented on Realtime Trains is created using a variety of sources and human input. In 2017, Realtime Trains installed GPS tracking devices in trains to allow services to be tracked during a diesel gala on the Swanage Railway.

References

British companies established in 2012
Internet properties established in 2012
British websites
Transport websites